Barrie is a city in Ontario, Canada.

Barrie may also refer to:

 Barrie (company), a fashion company owned by Chanel
 Barrie (name)
 Barrie (band) a dream-pop band
 Barrie (electoral district), a former Canadian federal electoral district
 Barrie (provincial electoral district), a former Canadian provincial electoral district
 Barrie (train line), a train line in the Greater Toronto Area, Ontario, Canada
 Barrie School, a private school in Silver Spring, Maryland
 HMCS Barrie, a Royal Canadian Navy corvette

See also
 Barre (disambiguation)
 Barry (disambiguation)
 Berry (disambiguation)